Ronald James Durham (11 June 1921 – 25 June 1961) was an Australian rules footballer who played in the VFL in between 1943 and 1944 and then from 1946 to 1948 for the Richmond Football Club.
He played at Full back, won the club's best and fairest in 1943, and played in the 1947 finals series. His career was cut short by a serious knee injury.

Death
Ron Durham died while using an electric drill to install a heating plant in a greenhouse at his property in Bacchus Marsh. He received an electric shock and was found unconscious. He was taken to the local hospital but was unresponsive. Doctors decided to transfer him to the larger Footscray District Hospital. He died in an ambulance whilst being transferred.

References 

 Hogan P: The Tigers Of Old, Richmond FC, Melbourne 1996

External links
 
 

1921 births
1961 deaths
Richmond Football Club players
Richmond Football Club Premiership players
Jack Dyer Medal winners
Australian rules footballers from Victoria (Australia)
One-time VFL/AFL Premiership players
Accidental deaths in Victoria (Australia)